Malcom D'Shawn Brown (born February 2, 1994) is an American football defensive tackle  who is a free agent. He played college football at Texas. He was drafted by the New England Patriots with the 32nd overall pick in the 2015 NFL draft.

Early years
Brown attended Brenham High School in Brenham, Texas, where he was a three-sport athlete in football, basketball and track. A three-year starter, he recorded 125 tackles and 24 sacks during his high school football career. He also threw the shot put (top-throw of 48-8 or 14.91 meters) on the track team. Brown was regarded as a five-star recruit by Rivals.com and was ranked as the fifth-best defensive tackle and the 26th-best player overall in his class.

College career
Brown played in all 13 games as a true freshman at the University of Texas at Austin in 2012, recording 25 tackles. He took over as a starter his sophomore year in 2013, starting all 13 games. He finished the year with 68 tackles and two sacks, and won the team's Joseph W. Moore Tenacity Award for Defense along with Jackson Jeffcoat.

Brown remained a starter his junior season in 2014. He finished the season with 70 tackles, 13 tackles for loss, and 6.5 sacks and was a first-team All-Big 12 selection by The Associated Press and the league's coaches. He also received consensus All-American honors, and was named a finalist for the Bronko Nagurski Trophy (given to the best defensive player in college football), and the Outland Trophy. Brown finished the year as the Longhorns' season leader in tackles for loss, sacks, and forced fumbles.

After his junior season, Brown decided to forgo his senior year in an effort to declare for the 2015 NFL Draft.

Collegiate statistics

Professional career

2015 NFL Draft
Brown was drafted in the first round with the 32nd overall pick by the New England Patriots in the 2015 NFL Draft. He was the second defensive tackle to be selected, only behind Danny Shelton (No. 12, Browns). In addition, he was the first of five Texas Longhorns to be selected in 2015.

New England Patriots
On June 19, 2015, the New England Patriots signed Brown to a four-year, $7.61 million contract with $6.14 million guaranteed and a signing bonus of $3.79 million.

2015 season
On September 10, 2015, Brown made his regular season debut against the Pittsburgh Steelers and recorded his first NFL sack when he tackled wide receiver Antonio Brown, who was part of an attempted double pass by the Steelers. He finished his rookie season with 48 tackles (9th on the team) and 3.0 sacks (6th on the team).

2016 season
In Week 14, Brown recorded his first career safety in a 30–23 win over the Baltimore Ravens. He finished the regular season playing in all 16 games with 13 starts recording 50 tackles and three sacks. The Patriots finished the regular season with a 14–2 record.

On February 5, 2017, Brown was part of the Patriots team that won Super Bowl LI. In the game, he recorded one tackle as the Patriots defeated the Atlanta Falcons by a score of 34–28 in overtime.

2017 season
Brown finished his third season with 49 tackles and 2.5 sacks in 13 games. Brown helped the Patriots reach Super Bowl LII, but the team failed to repeat as Super Bowl Champions after losing 41-33 to the Philadelphia Eagles. Brown recorded six tackles in the Super Bowl.

2018 season
On May 2, 2018, the Patriots declined the fifth-year option on Brown's contract, making him a free agent at the end of the season. Brown finished the season with 39 tackles, one fumble recovery, one quarterback hit, and won his second Super Bowl ring after the Patriots beat the Los Angeles Rams 13-3 in Super Bowl LIII. Brown had two total tackles in the game.

New Orleans Saints

2019 season 

On March 14, 2019, Brown signed a three-year, $15 million contract with the New Orleans Saints. Brown finished the season with 34 tackles, five quarterback hits, two sacks, one pass defended and one fumble recovery.

2020 season 
In Week 9 against the Tampa Bay Buccaneers, Brown recorded a sack on his former Patriots teammate Tom Brady during the 38–3 win.

Jacksonville Jaguars
On March 17, 2021, Brown was traded to the Jacksonville Jaguars and signed a new two-year, $11 million contract.

On August 17, 2022, Brown was released by Jacksonville.

NFL career statistics

Regular season

Postseason

See also
 List of Texas Longhorns football All-Americans
 List of New England Patriots first-round draft picks

References

External links
New Orleans Saints bio
Texas Longhorns bio

1994 births
Living people
People from Brenham, Texas
Players of American football from Texas
American football defensive tackles
Texas Longhorns football players
All-American college football players
New England Patriots players
New Orleans Saints players
Jacksonville Jaguars players